Dowlatabad is a village in Balkh Province in northern Afghanistan.

The village is located in Dawlatabad, a landlocked district in northwestern Balkh province, in northern Afghanistan. The district consists of 52 villages located around the center of the district. Major ethnic groups in this district are Uzbek, Turkmen, Tajik, Hazara, Pashtun, and Arab.

See also 
 Dawlatabad District

References

External links 
Satellite map at Maplandia.com 

Populated places in Balkh Province